Kanella, is a Cretan folk dance from Rethymno, Greece. It is very widespread in Crete. It is danced in a circle and is a variation to the siganos dance. The name of the dance is derived from the song.

See also
Music of Greece
Greek dances

References
Ελληνικοί παραδοσιακοί χοροί: Κανέλλα

Greek dances